Neha Saxena is an Indian television actress. She is well known for portraying the character of Mauli Banerjee in Star Plus's Popular show Tere Liye. She was last seen portraying the character of Siddhi in &TV's Siddhi Vinayak.

Career
Neha Saxena began her acting career with a role in Sajan Ghar Jaana Hai, where she played Dhaani Ambar Raghuvanshi.

Personal life 
Saxena was in a long term relationship with television actor Shakti Arora. The couple got married on 6 April 2018.

Filmography

Television

References

External links
 

Living people
Indian television actresses
Year of birth missing (living people)